Gabriel Horacio González (born November 13, 1980 in General Gelly (Santa Fe), Argentina) is an Argentine footballer currently playing for Club Unión (Villa Krause) in Argentina.

Teams
  Douglas Haig 2000-2003
  Huracán de Tres Arroyos 2003-2007
  Godoy Cruz de Mendoza 2007-2008
  Santiago Wanderers 2009
  Douglas Haig 2010–2013
  Unión Mar del Plata 2013–2014
  General Rojo 2014–2015
  Club Unión (Villa Krause) 2015–

Titles
  Huracán de Tres Arroyos 2004-2005 (Primera B Nacional Championship)
  Godoy Cruz de Mendoza 2007-2008 (Primera B Nacional Championship)
  Douglas Haig 2009-2010 (Torneo Argentino B Championship)

References
 

1980 births
Living people
Argentine footballers
Argentine expatriate footballers
Huracán de Tres Arroyos footballers
Godoy Cruz Antonio Tomba footballers
Santiago Wanderers footballers
Primera B de Chile players
Expatriate footballers in Chile
Club Atlético Douglas Haig players
Association footballers not categorized by position
Sportspeople from Santa Fe Province